The 2016 Malaysia FA Cup Final was the 27th final of the Malaysia FA Cup, the Malaysia football cup competition. Johor Darul Ta'zim F.C. assured a place for the 2017 AFC Cup group stage.

Background 
The final was played on 14 May 2016 at Shah Alam Stadium.

Route to the Final

Johor Darul Ta'zim

PKNS

Ticket allocation 
Each club will receive an allocation of 75,000 tickets; 50,000 tickets for JDT, 15,000 tickets for PKNS and 10,000 tickets for purchase online. Ticket prices for adult RM50 and children RM5.

Rules
The final was played as a single match. If tied after regulation, extra time and, if necessary, penalty shoot-out would be used to decide the winner.

Match

Details

See also
 2016 Malaysia Cup Final

References

Final
FA Final